Homalocnemis is a genus of flies which is placed in a family of its own, the Homalocnemidae. There are about seven species in the genus found in the Afrotropical, Neotropical, and Australasian regions, suggestive of a Gondwanan origin. The genus was formerly considered a primitive empidoid and placed variously in the Hybotidae or in the empidid subfamily Brachystomatinae. They are recognized by their wing venation which includes a long anal cell and a long basal segment of the antennal style.

Species in the genus include:
New Zealand
 H. adelensis (Miller, 1913)
 H. inexpleta Collin, 1928
 H. perspicua (Hutton, 1901)
 H. maculipennis Malloch, 1932
Namibia
 H. namibiensis Chvála, 1991
Chile
 H. praesumpta Collin, 1928
 H. nigripennis Philippi, 1865

References 

Brachycera genera